Middle Mountain is a mountain located in the Catskill Mountains of New York east-southeast of Downsville. Mary Smith Hill is located west of Middle Mountain and Beech Hill is located east.

References

Mountains of Delaware County, New York
Mountains of New York (state)